UFC Fight Night: MacDonald vs. Saffiedine (also known as UFC Fight Night 54) was a mixed martial arts event held at the Scotiabank Centre in Halifax, Nova Scotia, Canada on October 4, 2014.

Background
This event was the first event the UFC hosted in Halifax and the third event in Canada in 2014, following The Ultimate Fighter Nations Finale: Bisping vs. Kennedy and UFC 174.

The main event featured a welterweight bout between Rory MacDonald and Tarec Saffiedine.

A bout between Paige VanZant and Kailin Curran was briefly linked to this event, but delayed a month and rescheduled for UFC Fight Night 57, after VanZant suffered a minor injury.

Aljamain Sterling was expected to face Mitch Gagnon at this event. However, Sterling was forced to withdraw due to an injury and was replaced by Rob Font.  Subsequently, Font pulled out of the fight the week of the event and was replaced by promotional newcomer Roman Salazar.

Louis Gaudinot was expected to face Paddy Holohan at the event.  However, Gaudinot pulled out of the fight in the week leading up to the event and was replaced by promotional newcomer Chris Kelades.

The main card was slated to air on Fox Sports 1, but due to the length of game 2 of the 2014 National League Division Series between the San Francisco Giants and Washington Nationals, which went well into extra innings, the event was broadcast on FX instead.

A few months after the event, it was revealed that Pedro Munhoz tested positive for elevated levels of testosterone after his win against Jerrod Sanders. Munhoz's camp requested testing documentation and didn't receive it until three months later. He said a review of the results by anti-doping specialist Paul Scott determined that his testosterone was not, in fact, elevated, coming in at 850 ng/mL, or on the high end of the normal range for men his age. He admitted to using two supplements allowed by the UFC that may have elevated his testosterone, but not outside the legal limit. On November 4, 2015, Munhoz was suspended for one year retroactive to his fight and his win was changed to a no-contest.

Results

Bonus awards
The following fighters were awarded $50,000 bonuses:

Fight of the Night: Patrick Holohan vs. Chris Kelades
Performance of the Night: Rory MacDonald and Olivier Aubin-Mercier

See also
List of UFC events
2014 in UFC

References

UFC Fight Night
Mixed martial arts in Canada
Sport in Nova Scotia
2014 in mixed martial arts